Using Daeng Rangka, also known as Husein Daeng Rangka (1845 - 1927) was the last Makassan trepanger, an Indonesian sea cucumber harvester, to visit Australia. He was born in Labbakang, in the south Celebes, and owned one of the first trepanging licences issued by the South Australian Government. His published accounts and memoirs - for his lived well into the 20th century - have formed the basis for great study in the history of Australia–Indonesia relations.

Using suffered several setbacks during his career. His ship was wrecked on Melville Island in 1886, and he fought off Australian Aboriginal attacks with a rifle until rescued. He was wrecked once more in 1895, and forced to undertake a 644 kilometer journey in a canoe. Working in a time of great decline in Makassan trepanging in Australasia, Using was sent by a fellow entrepreneur to sound out the Australian government on their new laws restricting the trade to Australian businesses in the 1890s. After two more wreckings, and in the climate of general decline in trepanging, he retired in 1907 after his final visit to the country, and lived the remainder of his life in Kampong Maloku.

Due to his exploits against the Australian Aboriginals, including the legend that he abducted the wife of a local Aboriginal leader during his time at Melville Bay, and that he is believed to have had two Aboriginal wives, Using's name is still well known in Aboriginal communities. His name is often recorded as Husein Daeng Rangka as the name Husein has Arabic roots and becomes Using when translated into the Makassarese language. The 'Daeng' is derived from an honorific title of Gowa.

References

Citations

Sources 

 

1845 births
1927 deaths
People from Sulawesi
Indonesian businesspeople
Fishers